Joelle Clarke is a politician from Saint Kitts and Nevis who has served in the government of Terrance Drew since 2022.

References 

Living people
Saint Kitts and Nevis Labour Party politicians
Environment ministers of Saint Kitts and Nevis
21st-century women politicians
Women government ministers of Saint Kitts and Nevis
Saint Kitts and Nevis women in politics
Year of birth missing (living people)